The 1918 Camp Zachary Taylor football team represented Camp Zachary Taylor in college football during the 1918 college football season.

Schedule

References

Camp Zachary Taylor
Camp Zachary Taylor football